The 1969 Canadian Grand Prix was a Formula One motor race held at Mosport Park on September 20, 1969. It was race 9 of 11 in both the 1969 World Championship of Drivers and the 1969 International Cup for Formula One Manufacturers. The 90-lap race was won from pole position by Belgian driver Jacky Ickx in a works Brabham-Ford, with teammate Jack Brabham second and Jochen Rindt third in a works Lotus-Ford.

The race was the last World Championship Grand Prix in which Climax-powered cars were entered. One of the entrants, Al Pease, in an Eagle-Climax, became the only driver in F1 history to be disqualified for driving too slowly. The other entrant, John Cordts in a Brabham-Climax, retired after only ten laps.

By finishing sixth, Johnny Servoz-Gavin became the first (and, as of 2023, only) driver in Formula One history to score points in a four-wheel drive car.

Classification

Qualifying

Race

Championship standings after the race 

Drivers' Championship standings

Constructors' Championship standings

References

Canadian Grand Prix
Canadian Grand Prix
1969 in Canadian motorsport
Canadian Grand Prix